Government of Punjab may refer to:

Government of Punjab, India
Government of Punjab, Pakistan